Seyed Mojtaba Mirhashemi (born 21 March 1966) is an Iranian cross-country skier. He competed in the men's 15 kilometre classical event at the 2006 Winter Olympics.

References

1966 births
Living people
Iranian male cross-country skiers
Olympic cross-country skiers of Iran
Cross-country skiers at the 2006 Winter Olympics
Place of birth missing (living people)
Cross-country skiers at the 1999 Asian Winter Games
Cross-country skiers at the 2003 Asian Winter Games